Douglas St. Clive Budd Jansze,  (16 February 1909) was Ceylonese lawyer. He was the 31st Attorney General of Ceylon and Solicitor General of Ceylon.

Having graduated from the Ceylon University College with a BA degree from the University of London, Jansze qualified as an advocate from the Ceylon Law College and was admitted to the bar in 1934. He acted as Assistant Legal Draftsman in 1936 and Crown Counsel in 1937 and 1943 on occasions between when he was appointed a Crown Counsel in 1943; he served as Acting Deputy Commissioner, Compensation Claims (1946-1947). In 1949 he was appointed Senior Crown Counsel, having served in acting capacity. He was appointed Solicitor General of Ceylon in 1955 succeeding T. S. Fernando and served until 1957. He was appointed on 1 April 1957, succeeding Edward Fredrick Noel Gratiaen, and held the office until 1966. He was succeeded by Abdul Caffoor Mohamad Ameer.

He was appointed an Officer in the Order of the British Empire in the 1955 Birthday Honours.

References

Attorneys General of Ceylon
Solicitors General of Sri Lanka
1909 births
Year of death missing
Ceylonese Officers of the Order of the British Empire
Ceylonese advocates
Burgher lawyers
Alumni of the Ceylon University College
Alumni of Ceylon Law College